Kardlu (also Romanized as Kardlū and Kordlū; also known as Gardlū, Kurdulu, and Kūridlu) is a village in Qeshlaqat-e Afshar Rural District, Afshar District, Khodabandeh County, Zanjan Province, Iran. At the 2006 census, its population was 96, in 20 families.

References 

Populated places in Khodabandeh County